David Sánchez Cantú (2 February 1992 – 19 May 2017) was a Mexican professional boxer. Sánchez won the WBA Interim Super Flyweight title by defeating Breilor Teran in Tijuana, Baja California, Mexico on 24 May 2014.

Death
Sanchez and his brother, fellow professional boxer Jonathan, both died when the car they were traveling in, from Hermosillo to Poblado Miguel Aleman, collided with a tractor at the Hermosillo to Bahia Kino highway.

References

External links
 Professional boxing record for David Sanchez from BoxRec

1992 births
2017 deaths
Boxers from Puebla
People from Puebla (city)
Mexican male boxers
Road incident deaths in Mexico
Super-flyweight boxers